Samuel Robertson is a Scottish actor and model.  He portrays  Adam Barlow in the ITV soap opera, Coronation Street; and Flynn in the E4 comedy-drama series, Beaver Falls.

Background
Robertson was born in Dundee, Scotland. He studied Drama and English at the University of Manchester, but dropped out at 18 to focus on his role as Adam Barlow in Coronation Street.

Career
In 2004, he joined the cast of Coronation Street as Adam Barlow and left in 2007.

In 2005 and 2006, he took part in the second and third series of Sky One's The Match.

In 2009, Sam joined the BBC Scotland soap opera River City as new character Innes Maitland.

Robertson played Flynn in the E4 series Beaver Falls, which aired in July 2011 in the UK.

In January 2013, Robertson was a housemate in the eleventh series of Celebrity Big Brother on Channel 5 in the UK. He was the second evictee of the series.

In 2016, Robertson reprised his role as Adam Barlow in Coronation Street.

Filmography

Film

Television

Awards and nominations

References

External links

Living people
Scottish male film actors
Scottish male soap opera actors
Scottish male television actors
Alumni of the University of Manchester
Male actors from Dundee
Scottish male models
Year of birth missing (living people)
21st-century Scottish male actors